Joshua Harris (born September 9, 1982) is a former American football quarterback.

College career
During his two years as a starter at Bowling Green State University, he led the Falcons to consecutive finishes in the top 25 nationally.  During his senior season, he led the Falcons to a victory over Northwestern University in the Motor City Bowl.  Harris finished his college career as the school leader in rushing touchdowns (43), and is third in passing yards (7,503) and passing touchdowns. At the time, he and Antwaan Randle El were the only two quarterbacks to have ever thrown for 40 touchdowns and rushed for 40 touchdowns in their careers in NCAA Division I FBS history.

He was the first quarterback to help popularize Urban Meyer's spread option offense.

2001: 81/132 for 1,022 yards with 9 TD vs 3 INT.  129 carries for 600 yards and 8 TD.
2002: 198/353 for 2,425 yards with 19 TD vs 11 INT.  186 carries for 737 yards and 20 TD.
2003: 325/494 for 3,813 yards with 27 TD vs 12 INT.  215 carries for 830 yards and 13 TD.

Professional career

Baltimore Ravens
Josh was originally drafted by the Baltimore Ravens in the 2004 NFL Draft.

Cleveland Browns
After a brief stay in Baltimore he went on to the Cleveland Browns for 2 seasons before he was released.

Calgary Stampeders
He signed with the Canadian Football League's Calgary Stampeders, in 2005. He had 5 carries for 40 yards, and never had a pass attempt.

New York Giants
He was later picked up by the New York Giants. On July 7, 2006, he was released by the Giants.

Columbus Destroyers
He also played for the Arena Football League's Columbus Destroyers. He made a pivotal play in the AFL conference championship against the Georgia Force, with a key block that allowed for the winning score.

Retirement
He retired from professional football in 2008 to focus on his advertising company, Joshua1and5.

Marion Blue Racers
He came out of retirement in 2011 to play for the Marion Blue Racers. In their first game, he ran for the game-winning touchdown with 27 seconds remaining. It was also the expansion franchise's first victory. He led his team to an 8-2 regular season record and a 2nd-place finish in the CIFL. He also led them to the CIFL Championship Game, where they lost 44-29 to the Cincinnati Commandos. Harris has re-signed with the Blue Racers, who have moved to the United Indoor Football League for the 2012 season.

Statistics
Through end of the 2011 season, Harris' Indoor Football statistics are as follows:

Personal life
He is the son of former NFL player M.L. Harris. He is married to his wife Tamara and they have 2 sons. Currently, Josh is the President and CEO of Freedom Direct LLC a final expense life insurance call center.

See also
 List of Arena Football League and National Football League players

References 

http://bgsufalcons.cstv.com/sports/m-footbl/mtt/harris_josh00.html

1982 births
Living people
American football quarterbacks
Bowling Green Falcons football players
Marion Blue Racers players
Calgary Stampeders players
Cleveland Browns players
New York Giants players
Baltimore Ravens players
Columbus Destroyers players